is a Japanese video game writer.

Daisuke Watanabe may also refer to:

, Japanese actor
, Japanese long jumper
Daisuke Watanabe (figure skater), Japanese figure skater